Guy Spy and the Crystals of Armageddon is an action game by ReadySoft that was released for DOS, Atari ST, and Amiga in 1992. Guy Spy is a cartoon adventure similar to Dragon's Lair and Space Ace but with longer sections.

Plot
Guy is summoned before the chief of international security and informed that the evil Baron Von Max has located the whereabouts of the legendary Crystals of Armageddon. Max needs these crystals to power the doomsday machine he has constructed in the mountains at an unknown location.

Reception
Computer Gaming World praised the graphics and the variety of gameplay in the 13 levels, concluding that it "does a great job of providing thrills for the average arcade player".

References

CU Amiga, August 1992, page 54-56

1992 video games
DOS games
Amiga games
Atari ST games
Commodore CDTV games
ReadySoft Incorporated games
Video games scored by Mark Knight
Video games developed in the United States